Hugoton  is a city in and the county seat of Stevens County, Kansas, United States.  As of the 2020 census, the population of the city was 3,747.

History

Settlers from McPherson, Kansas established a settlement in what was then west-central Seward County, Kansas in 1885. They originally named this settlement Hugo in honor of French writer Victor Hugo, but then changed its name to Hugoton to distinguish it from Hugo, Colorado. Hugoton's first church, Hugoton United Methodist, was also the first in Stevens County and was founded in 1886; it is still active as of 2019. The first post office in Hugoton was established in April 1886.

In 1886, the Kansas Legislature reestablished the surrounding area as Stevens County, and Gov. John Martin designated Hugoton as the interim county seat. This set off a violent county seat war with nearby Woodsdale. Hugoton became the permanent county seat in 1887, but the conflict continued, culminating in the Hay Meadow Massacre of 1888. Woodsdale founder and attorney Samuel Newitt Wood, heavily invested in the conflict for the county seat, was assassinated by James Brennen, one of the men involved in the Hay Meadow Massacre, outside the Hugoton courthouse on June 23, 1891.

During the 1890s, economic decline drove many residents to leave for newly opened territories in the American Southwest, and the population declined significantly. The Santa Fe Railway reached Hugoton in 1913, which spurred growth. Natural gas was discovered southwest of the city in 1927, leading to the development of the Hugoton Natural Gas Area and the transformation of Hugoton into a major center of natural gas extraction.

Hugoton reportedly served as a temporary home for infamous criminals Bonnie and Clyde. They lived in the unincorporated areas near Hugoton, assuming the aliases of Jewell and Blackie Underwood. Jewell operated a cafe, Jewell's Cafe, and Blackie reportedly worked on area farms. Locals believed they ran a bootlegging operation out of the cafe. Clyde was officially in prison during the time they are claimed to be in the Hugoton area, but locals still insist Jewell and Blackie were Bonnie and Clyde. Receipts from Jewel's Cafe were found in the duo's vehicle after their deaths in a 1934 shoot-out.

In the mid-1930s, Hugoton, along with much of Kansas and parts of other nearby states, suffered the effects of the Dust Bowl, which ravaged the Great Plains in waves between 1934 and 1940. Southwest Kansas was hit particularly hard between 1932 and 1936. The famous "Black Sunday" dust storm that marks the naming of the Dust Bowl as a geographic area encompassing most of the mid-United States and affecting the entire country, hit Hugoton and neighboring towns in multiple counties and in Oklahoma early on April 14, 1935.

Geography

It also lies within, and is the namesake of, the Hugoton Natural Gas Area. The Hugoton natural gas field is the largest such field in North America and the second largest in the world.

Climate
Hugoton has a semi-arid steppe climate (Köppen BSk) with hot, dry summers and cold, dry winters. The average temperature is 55 °F (13 °C), and the average yearly precipitation is 18.4 inches (468 mm). Hugoton experiences precipitation an average of 58 days a year and snowfall an average of 4 days a year. Snowfall averages 10.4 inches (264 mm) per year. On average, the coldest month is January, the hottest month is July, and the wettest month is May. The hottest temperature recorded in Hugoton was 112 °F (44 °C) in 1980; the coldest temperature recorded was -20 °F (-29 °C) in 1959.

Demographics

2010 census
As of the 2010 census, there were 3,904 people, 1,413 households, and 993 families residing in the city. The racial makeup of the city was 87.0% White, 0.8% American Indian, 0.3% African American, 0.2% Asian, 10.1% from some other race, and 1.6% from two or more races. Hispanics or Latinos of any race were 36.4% of the population.

There were 1,413 households, of which 40.3% had children under the age of 18 living with them, 57.5% were married couples living together, 4.5% had a male householder with no wife present, 8.2% had a female householder with no husband present, and 29.7% were non-families. 26.8% of all households were made up of individuals, and 11.7% had someone living alone who was 65 years of age or older. The average household size was 2.71, and the average family size was 3.32.

In the city, the population was spread out, with 30.3% under the age of 18, 8.8% from 18 to 24, 25.1% from 25 to 44, 22.4% from 45 to 64, and 13.4% who were 65 years of age or older. The median age was 33.6 years. For every 100 females, there were 98.8 males. For every 100 females age 18 and over, there were 96.3 males age 18 and over.

The median income for a household in the city was $52,161, and the median income for a family was $57,269. Males had a median income of $45,750 versus $33,188 for females. The per capita income for the city was $20,851. About 11.6% of families and 14.8% of the population were below the poverty line, including 22.1% of those under age 18 and 7.6% of those age 65 or over.

2000 census
As of the 2000 census, there were 3,708 people, 1,380 households, and 968 families residing in the city. The racial makeup of the city was 81.53% White, 1.08% African American, 0.67% Native American, 0.32% Asian, 14.51% from other races, and 1.89% from two or more races. Hispanic or Latino of any race were 22.92% of the population.

There were 1,380 households, out of which 37.8% had children under the age of 18 living with them, 58.8% were married couples living together, 8.4% had a female householder with no husband present, and 29.8% were non-families. 27.2% of all households were made up of individuals, and 13.9% had someone living alone who was 65 years of age or older. The average household size was 2.64 and the average family size was 3.25.

In the city the population was spread out, with 30.5% under the age of 18, 8.6% from 18 to 24, 27.6% from 25 to 44, 18.7% from 45 to 64, and 14.6% who were 65 years of age or older. The median age was 34 years. For every 100 females, there were 92.7 males. For every 100 females age 18 and over, there were 87.9 males.

The median income for a household in the city was $41,932, and the median income for a family was $50,225. Males had a median income of $37,930 versus $22,750 for females. The per capita income for the city was $17,115. About 6.9% of families and 9.3% of the population were below the poverty line, including 7.8% of those under age 18 and 2.2% of those age 65 or over.

Economy
As of 2011, 67.5% of the population over the age of 16 was in the civilian labor force with 64.9% being employed and 2.6% unemployed. The composition, by occupation, of the employed civilian labor force was:  27.2% in management, business, science, and arts; 25.2% in natural resources, construction, and maintenance; 25.0% in sales and office occupations; 14.3% in service occupations; 8.3% in production, transportation, and material moving. The three industries employing the largest percentages of the working civilian labor force were:  agriculture, forestry, fishing and hunting, and mining (23.0%); educational services, health care, and social assistance (20.7%); and construction (8.3%).

The cost of living in Hugoton is relatively low; compared to a U.S. average of 100, the cost of living index for the city is 80.5. As of 2011, the median home value in the city was $79,300, the median selected monthly owner cost was $991 for housing units with a mortgage and $445 for those without, and the median gross rent was $628.

Government
Hugoton is a city of the second class with a mayor-council form of government. The city council consists of five members and meets on the first Monday after the 4th day of each month. The mayor and the council members are elected for four-year terms.

As the county seat, Hugoton is the administrative center of Stevens County. The county courthouse is located downtown, and all departments of the county government base their operations in the city.

Hugoton lies within Kansas's 1st U.S. Congressional District. For the purposes of representation in the Kansas Legislature, the city is in the 39th district of the Kansas Senate and the 124th district of the Kansas House of Representatives.

Education

Primary and secondary education
Hugoton Public Schools (USD 210) operates five public schools in Hugoton:
 Hugoton Primary School (Grades Pre-K-2)
 Hugoton Intermediate School (3-6)
 Hugoton Middle School (7-8)
 Hugoton High School (9-12)
 Hugoton Learning Academy (7-12), charter school

Heritage Christian Academy, a Christian school, offers preschool and classes for grades K-8.

Transportation
U.S. Route 56 and K-25 enter Hugoton concurrently from the north, intersecting K-51, which runs east-west, in the southern part of the city. Both U.S. 56 and K-25 then run concurrently with K-51 to the west.

Hugoton Municipal Airport is located on the south side of U.S. 56 less than a mile west of the city. Publicly owned, it has two paved runways and is used for general aviation.

A line of the Cimarron Valley Railroad passes through the northwestern corner of the city.

Media
The Hugoton Hermes is the city's sole newspaper, published weekly.

Two radio stations are licensed to Hugoton: K222AK, a translator station of NPR affiliate High Plains Public Radio in Garden City, Kansas, broadcasts from Hugoton on 92.3 FM; KFXX-FM broadcasts from Garden City on 106.7 FM, playing a Classic Hits format.

Hugoton is in the Wichita-Hutchinson, Kansas television market.

Notable people
 Billy Drago (1945–2019), actor 
 Steve Morris (1946- ), eight-year Kansas Senate president, 2005-2013

See also
 Hay Meadow Massacre

References

Further reading

External links

 City of Hugoton
 Hugoton - Directory of Public Officials
 USD 210, local school district
 Dust Bowl photos of Hugoton
 Hugoton City Map, KDOT

Cities in Kansas
County seats in Kansas
Cities in Stevens County, Kansas
Populated places established in 1885
1885 establishments in Kansas
Victor Hugo